Al Naimi may refer to:

Ali I. Al-Naimi (born 1935), the Saudi Minister of Petroleum and Mineral Resources
Al-Naimi (tribe), a large Arab Bedouin tribe based primarily in the Arab states of the Persian Gulf